The Wichita Open is a golf tournament on the Korn Ferry Tour. Formerly known as the Air Capital Classic, it is played annually at the Crestview Country Club in Wichita, Kansas, U.S. It is one of four original Tour events still played.

Winners

Bolded golfers graduated to the PGA Tour via the Korn Ferry Tour regular-season money list.

References

External links 

Coverage on the Korn Ferry Tour's official site

Korn Ferry Tour events
Golf in Kansas
Sports in Wichita, Kansas
Recurring sporting events established in 1990
1990 establishments in Kansas